The SEC men's basketball tournament is the conference tournament in basketball for the Southeastern Conference (SEC). It is a single-elimination tournament that involves all league schools (currently 14). Its seeding is based on regular season records. The winner receives the conference's automatic bid to the NCAA men's basketball tournament; however, the official conference championship is awarded to the team or teams with the best regular season record.

Format
With the abandonment of divisions in SEC men's basketball starting in 2011–12, the top four teams in the conference standings received first-round byes. Bracketing was identical to that of the SEC women's basketball tournament—note that SEC women's basketball has long been organized in a single league table without divisions.

Since the SEC expanded to 14 schools with the arrival of Missouri and Texas A&M in 2012, the 2013 tournament was the first with a new format. Both men's and women's tournaments have the four bottom seeds (#11 throughout #14) playing opening-round games, with the top four seeds receiving a "double-bye" into the quarterfinals.

Divisional format (1991-2012) 
Before 2012, the top two teams in both the Eastern and Western Divisions received byes in the first round, while #3 in the East played #6 from the West, #4 played #5, etc. The brackets were set up so that #2 would play the winner of the game involving #3 from the other division, and #1 would play the winner of the game involving #4 from the other division. Barring an upset, the semifinals would pit #1 from one division against #2 from the other division, and the championship game would feature the regular season winners of the two divisions, although this rarely happened in practice.

History
Throughout its history, the SEC tournament championship basketball game has been held at various storied sites, including the Georgia Dome, Mercedes-Benz Superdome, Bridgestone Arena, the BJCC Coliseum, the Pyramid, Rupp Arena, Louisville Gardens, and (in an 2008 emergency relocation) Alexander Memorial Coliseum at Georgia Tech.

From 1933 to 1950, the official SEC Champion was determined by a tournament, except for 1935. Beginning in 1951, a round-robin schedule was introduced and the SEC title was awarded to the team with the highest regular season in-conference winning percentage.  From 1951 to 1964, the round-robin consisted of 14 games. In 1965 and 1966, it was expanded to 16 games with the departure of Georgia Tech from the league. From 1967 to 1991, the round-robin schedule was 18 games due to Tulane's departure. Starting with the 1991–1992 season, the SEC split into an Eastern and Western Division with the re-expansion to 12 members, but continued to recognize the SEC Champion based on a winning percentage over the new 16-game conference schedule. The league also began awarding division championships. Divisions would be eliminated starting with the 2011–2012 season. With the addition of Texas A&M and Missouri to the conference, the regular season expanded to an 18 conference game schedule starting with the 2012–13 season.

In 1979, the tournament was renewed with the winner receiving the SEC's automatic bid to the NCAA Tournament, but the official league champion remained the team(s) with the best regular season record.

In 2000, the Arkansas Razorbacks became the first team since the league expansion in 1992 to win the conference tournament by playing all four days, beating Georgia, Kentucky, LSU, and Auburn to receive the conference's automatic bid to the NCAA Basketball Championships. Auburn was the first SEC team to accomplish this feat in 1985 when they defeated Ole Miss, LSU, Florida, and Alabama to win their first SEC tournament.  Since then, the feat has been accomplished three times, first in 2008 by Georgia.  In 2009, Mississippi State repeated that feat, defeating Georgia, South Carolina, LSU, and Tennessee to receive the conference's automatic bid to the NCAA Basketball Championships. Auburn achieved the feat a second time in 2019, defeating Missouri, South Carolina, Florida and Tennessee.

The first seven games of the 2008 tournament were played at the Georgia Dome. During overtime of Game 7 between Mississippi State and Alabama, a tornado struck the downtown Atlanta area, damaging the Georgia Dome and several buildings surrounding it, including CNN Center. MSU and Alabama returned after a 64-minute delay to finish their game, but the last quarterfinal game of the day, between Georgia and Kentucky, was postponed until the next day, and the remaining four games of the tournament were moved to Alexander Memorial Coliseum at Georgia Tech. Only credentialed individuals were allowed to attend, including players' families, bands, cheerleaders, and media. No other spectators were allowed in the building.

The 2020 tournament was canceled after the first round due to concerns over the spread of COVID-19, after the World Health Organization declared the outbreak a pandemic on 11 March 2020. Initially, a decision was made to play the remaining games without fans in attendance, but as the situation progressed the event was ultimately canceled outright.
The conference's NCAA men's basketball tournament auto-bid was awarded to the regular season champion, Kentucky. but ultimately the 2020 NCAA tournament itself would also be cancelled.

Tournaments

Notes 

Note A: No tournament was held in 1935.
Note B: No tournament was held from 1953 to 1978.
Note C: No MVP Selection made from 1933 to 1952.
Note D: The Tournament was canceled after the first round in 2020. No MVP selection was made.

Television coverage

Tournament championships by school 

†Former member of the SEC
Kentucky defeated Georgia in the 1988 SEC tournament final, but the tournament title was vacated later because of NCAA violations.

Venues

Notes

References

 
Recurring sporting events established in 1933
1933 establishments in Georgia (U.S. state)